Navarasa is the soundtrack album for the Netflix original series of the same name jointly created by Mani Ratnam and Jayendra Panchapakesan. The series consists of nine short films based on the nine Indian aesthetics and has music composed by A. R. Rahman, Santhosh Narayanan, Sundaramurthy KS, Rajesh Murugesan, Karthik, Ron Ethan Yohann, Govind Vasantha, Justin Prabhakaran and Vishal Bhardwaj.

Overview 
List of the composers working for their respective short films:

Production 
The original soundtrack and score of Navarasa is composed by A. R. Rahman, Santhosh Narayanan, Sundaramurthy KS, Rajesh Murugesan, Karthik, Ron Ethan Yohann, Govind Vasantha and Justin Prabhakaran. Initially D. Imman, Ghibran and Aruldev, were signed in for the project, but since the directors of the respective anthologies left the project, Santhosh, Sundaramurthy and Rajesh took over the project. Vishal Bhardwaj made his debut in Tamil, composing for the segment Inmai directed by Rathindran R. Prasad.

As the series is based on the Indian concept or Navarasas (Indian aesthetics), each segment directed by five directors represent a different emotion or rasa such as anger, compassion, courage, disgust, fear, laughter, love, peace and wonder. The songs in the anthology segments scored by varied music directors also represent a different emotion. The music directors, along with the film artists, directors and other technicians, worked on the series without receiving any renumeration.

Composition 
Though multiple composers were being a part of the anthology, only nine songs were composed for the series. The episode Guitar Kambi Mele Nindru, featured five to seven songs scored by Karthik accompanied within the duration of 35–40 minutes. The tracks "Thooriga" is inspired from the song "Ninnukori Varnam" from Agni Natchathiram, composed by Ilaiyaraaja, and the first bit prelude of "Adhirudha" is inspired from "Für Elise", a composition for piano by German musician Ludwig van Beethoven, and Karthik played this song in guitar. After Sarjun being roped in for the anthology whose segment titled Thunindha Pinn, Sundaramurthy KS, who worked with Sarjun in the short films Lakshmi (2017), Maa (2018) and with the feature film Airaa (2019), was roped in for this segment, and composed two songs: "The Bleeding Heart (Osara Parandhu Vaa)" and "The Comrade Theme (Dhooramai Kanaa)" sung by Uday Kannan. Composers Govind Vasantha and Justin Prabhakaran had scored two tracks each for the series. The song "Kannunjal" is set in Anandabhairavi raga.

Release 
A. R. Rahman composed the theme music for the official teaser released on 9 July 2021. The theme features violin interlude, blended with classical instruments and also vocals accompanied by Nakul Abhyankar in the background. Think Music India released the theme song through streaming platforms the very same day, along with five other songs as singles, the first being "Thooriga" from the segment Guitar Kambi Mele Nindru which was composed and sung by Karthik and written by Madhan Karky. The second song titled "The Bleeding Heart (Osara Parandhu Vaa)" was recorded by Vrusha Balu of Super Singer Season 8 fame and composed by Sundaramurthy KS with lyrics penned by Soundararajan released on the same day. The full soundtrack was later released on 16 July 2021.

Reception 
Navarasas soundtrack received mostly positive reviews from critics and audiences. Karthik Keramalu of Hindustan Times opined the album as "well composed" and rated the album 4 out of 5. Both the websites Behindwoods and Indiaglitz had stated that "Suriya's segment dominates the music playlist with truly enchanting music pieces by Karthik, which was the exciting one" but they wrote that "A. R. Rahman's 'Navarasa Title Theme' is the standout from the lot". Milliblogs Karthik Srinivasan wrote in its review for Navarasa title theme, saying "the sweep of the theme is indicative of the working relationship of Rahman and Mani Ratnam (Navarasa's producer) and how it still has that spark after almost 30 years!". In another review, Karthik stated that the songs "Thooriga" as "a great blending of a new song with an old, very familiar, and much-loved soul"; "Alai Alaiyaaga" as a "beautifully calm melody", "Yaadho" and "Kannunjal" as "better" in standards. Vipin Nair's review about the soundtrack in Music Aloud stated the album as "brilliant" giving a 3.5 out of 5 rating.

Track listing

Navarasa: The Symphony of Emotions 
On 5 August 2021, a day before the official release of the series, Mani Ratnam and Jayendra Panchapakesan hosted a live music event for the series' promotions titled Navarasa: The Symphony of Emotions. Based on the Indian concepts of Navarasas, it was hosted by Dhivyadharshini and featured musical performances from artists all over the world, each artist represent different emotions through the numbers performed: anger, compassion, courage, disgust, fear, laughter, love, peace and wonder, and featured a live interaction between the artists, crew members and technicians working on the series. A fundraiser event, the artists performed live film music on stage, to support the technicains working on the Tamil music industry, who were affected by the COVID-19 pandemic. The ensemble artists performed in the songs were flautist Naveen Kumar, Viveick Rajagopalan, Abhishek Kumar, K.C. Loy, Piyush Rajani and The Fine Tuners, Mahesh Raghvan, Nandini Shankar, Shashaa Tirupati, Anantha Krishnan, Ricky Kej, Kunal Naik and A. R. Rahman's K. M. M. C. Choir.

Musical numbers

Personnel 
Credits adapted from Think Music India

Composer(s) 

 A. R. Rahman
 Santhosh Narayanan
 Sundaramurthy KS
 Rajesh Murugesan
 Karthik
 Ron Ethan Yohann
 Govind Vasantha
 Justin Prabhakaran
 Vishal Bhardwaj

Musician(s) 

 Guitars: Keba Jeremiah, Joseph Vijay, Dhruv Vishwanath
 Ukulele: Keba Jeremiah
 Bass: Naveen Napier
 Keys: Hentry Kuruvilla, Ramesh Vinayakam
 Flute: Naveen Kumar, Kareem Kamalakar, Sathish
 Sarod: Sarang Kulkarni
 Sitar: Asad Khan
 Veena: Rajesh Vaidhya
 Solo Violin: Prabhakar, Vignesh
 Mandolin: Tapas Roy
 Cello: Balaji
 Drums: Sivamani, Rahul Muralidhar
 Nadaswaram: Thirumoorthy, Balasubramani
 Tavil: Rajinimurugan
 Pambai: Pazhani, Janardhan
 Rhythm: Buddhar Kalai Kuzhu

Orchestra 

 Score conductors: Oleg Kontradenko, Dzijan Emin (Fame's Macedonian Symphonic Orchestra), V. J. Srinivasamurthy (Sunshine Orchestra), R. Prabhakar, Yensone Bhagyanathan, Kannan, Collins Rajenran (Chennai Strings Orchestra)
 Sound Engineer: Alen Hadzi Stefanov
 Protocol Operator: Koca Davicodenic, Igor Vasilev
 Stage Manager: Teodora Arsovska, Ilija Grkovski
 Orchestrator: Joaquim Badia
 Additional Orchestration: Neelesh Mandalapu
 India Orchestra Coordination: Andrew T. Mackay (for Bohemia Junction)
 Strings arrangement: Collins Rajendran

Backing vocalist(s) 

 Arjun Chandy
 Veena Murali
 Deepthi Suresh
 Rakshita Suresh
 Maalavika Sundar
 Nakul Abhyankar
 Deepak
 Aravind Srinivas
 Hiral Viradia
 Madhumitha Shankar
 Jithin Raj
 Shenbagaraj
 Santosh Hariharan
 Vignesh Narayanan
 Yogi Sekar
 Lavita Lobo
 Madhura Dhara Talluri
 Akshara
 Vithusayni
 Sireesha Bhagavatula
 Narayanan
 Rohit Fernandes
 Pravin Saivi 
 Britto Michael
 Chinna
 Sowmya Mahadevan

Sound Engineers 

 Panchathan Record Inn, Chennai – Suresh Permal, Karthik Sekaran, T. R. Krishna Chetan, Hentry Kuruvilla, Nakul Abhyankar, Kumaran Sivamani
 AM Studios, Chennai – S. Sivakumar, Kannan Ganpat, Pradeep Menon, Krishnan Subramaniyan, Manoj Raman, Aravind MS
 KM Music Conservatory, Chennai – Aravind Crescendo
 Future Tense Studios, Chennai – Santhosh Narayanan, R. K. Sundar
 Resound India, Chennai – Sai Shravanam
 Offbeat Music Ventures, Chennai – Aswin George John
 Krimson Avenue Studios, Chennai – Sethu Thankachan, Vishnu Namboodhiri, Abin Pushpakaran, Balu Thankachan
 Threedots Film Studio, Kerala – M. T. Aditya Srinivasan
 20db Sound Studios, Chennai – Avinash Satish
 Studio Satya, Mumbai – Salman Khan Afridi
 Abbey Road Studios, London – Christian Wright

Production 

 Music Supervisors: T. R. Krishna Chetan, Sethu Thankachan, Nizammudeen, Abin Pushpakaran, Arvind Sridhar, Mayukh Sarkar
 Music Programmers: T. R. Krishna Chetan, Jerry Silvester Vincent, Pawan CH, Santosh Dayanidhi, Kumaran Sivamani, Jim Sathya, Nakul Abhyankar, Pradvay Sivashankar, Sethu Thankachan, Balu Thankachan, Nizammudeen, Sabin Jose, RK Sundar, Britto Michael, Chinna, Ganesh Kumar B
 Additional Programming: Pradvay Sivashankar, Prithvi Chandrashekhar, Avinash Satish
 Mixed by: T. R. Krishna Chetan, P. A. Deepak, Suresh Permal, Amith Bal, RK Sundar, Sai Shravanam, Balu Thankachan, Sabin Jose, Karthik, Aswin George John
 Mastered by: Suresh Permal, Abin Pushpakaran, Balu Thankachan, Nizammudeen, Sai Shravanam, Sreejesh Nair
 Mastered for iTunes: S. Sivakumar, Shadab Rayeen, Balu Thankachan
 Mixing assistance: Abhishek Sortey, Dhananjay Kapekar
 Musicians co-ordinators: T. M. Faizuddin, Abdul Haiyum Siddique, B. Velavan, Meenakshi Santhosh
 Musicians' fixer: R. Samidurai, B. Velavan

References 

2021 soundtrack albums
Tamil film soundtracks
A. R. Rahman soundtracks
Santhosh Narayanan soundtracks